Global Vision is a non-governmental organization (NGO) that supports poor cancer patients in India. Based in Thane, it helps needy cancer patients medically and financially. It was founded in 2009.

Activities

Cancer Awareness Rally
On the occasion of World Cancer day, they conducted a cancer awareness rally that took place in the city of Bangalore.

Fund Raising
They organized an event “UMEED – 5 “A BETTER HOPE FOR TOMORROW” to raise funds for cancer patients. The donation of '35 lakhs were distributed to the patients. During the event, Global Vision awarded the successes of people from various fields.

References

External links
 Global Vision NGO, website

Cancer organisations based in India